Georges Michel may refer to:

Surnamed "Michel"
 Georges Michel (painter) (1763–1843), French painter, precursor of the Barbizon school
Georges Michel (footballer), Belgian who played Football at the 1920 Summer Olympics – Men's team squads

Surnamed "Georges-Michel" or "Georges Michel"
 Michel Georges-Michel (1883–1985), French painter and writer

See also
 Georges (disambiguation)
 Michel (disambiguation)
 Michel A. J. Georges (born 1959) Belgian biologist
 
 
 George Michael (disambiguation)